Sørfjorden is a  long fjord in Vestland county, Norway.  The fjord flows around the west and south sides of the island of Osterøy, going through the municipalities of Osterøy, Bergen, and Vaksdal.  The fjord begins at the village of Vaksdal where the Veafjorden flows into the Sørfjorden, it then heads west and then north before emptying into the Osterfjorden.  The fjord flows past the following villages: Bruvik, Vaksdal, Hausvik, Garnes, Ytre Arna, Hylkje, Breistein, Valestrandfossen, Steinstø and Hamre.

Prior to the opening of Osterøy Bridge in 1997 there were two ferries crossing the fjord: Haus–Garnes and Valestrandfossen–Breistein, the first one was closed when the bridge opened and the second one is still in operation.

References

Fjords of Vestland
Osterøy
Vaksdal
Geography of Bergen